Frattamaggiore (locally also known as Fratta) is a comune in the Metropolitan City of Naples, Campania, Italy. It was awarded the title of "City of art" in 2008 and named Benedictine city in 1997.
 
It is located in the Naples hinterland.

History
The first records of Frattamaggiore date to 921 AD, although the area was probably settled in pre-Roman times.  The people of Atella built a watchtower in response to the Vandal invasion of 455 AD, around which refugees from Miseno settled when their town was razed by the Saracens; here they also built a Catholic church in honour of Sossius, now the patron saint of Frattamaggiore.

Transportation
Frattamaggiore is served by:
 Provincial road 162, a freeway that connects the city to the Milano-Napoli freeway;
 a railway station on the Rome–Formia–Naples railway;
 Napoli Afragola railway station on the Rome–Naples high-speed line,  from Frattamaggiore;
 several bus lines of the Naples Public Transport Company that connect the city to Naples, Caserta, Afragola, Casoria, Sant'Antimo, Orta di Atella, Frattaminore and other closer cities;
 the Naples International Airport, A104 bis,  from Frattamaggiore.

Notable people

Massimo Stanzione (1585 – 1656), painter
Francesco Durante (1684 – 1755), composer 
Francesco Lodi (born 1984), football player
Lorenzo Insigne (born 1991), football player

Twin towns
 Striano, Italy, since 2006

References

External links
Official website 

Cities and towns in Campania